A by-election was held for the New South Wales Legislative Assembly electorate of St George on 20 May 1908. The by-election was triggered by the resignation of  former Premier Joseph Carruthers.

Dates

Results

Joseph Carruthers resigned.

See also
Electoral results for the district of St George
List of New South Wales state by-elections

Notes

References

New South Wales state by-elections
1908 elections in Australia
1900s in New South Wales